This is a list of commercial banks in Central African Republic

 Banque Internationale pour le Centrafrique (BICA)
 Banque Populaire Maroco-Centrafricaine (BPMC)
 Commercial Bank Centrafrique
 Ecobank

See also
 Central Bank of Central African States

General:
 List of banks in Africa

References

External links
 Website of Central Bank of Central African States

Banks
Central African Republic
 
Central African Republic